Utstein may refer to:

Places
Utstein Abbey, a historic abbey in Rennesøy, Norway
Utstein Church, a historic church in Rennesøy, Norway

Other
, a submarine in the Royal Norwegian Navy
Utstein Style, a set of guidelines for uniform reporting of cardiac arrest

See also
Utsteinen Nunatak, a nunatuk in Queen Maud Land, Antarctica